Hasanain Juaini is an Indonesian environmental conservationist, educator and winner of the Ramon Magsaysay Award.

References

Ramon Magsaysay Award winners
Indonesian environmentalists
Year of birth missing (living people)
Place of birth missing (living people)
Living people